George Peter Campbell (May 21, 1960 – January 11, 2023) was an American water polo player.

Raised in Irvine, California, and started swimming competitively at the age of nine. The four-time All-American led UC Irvine in scoring three of his four years there and helped the Anteaters win national titles in 1980 and '82. He was NCAA Player of the Year and NCAA tournament MVP in 1982. An Olympic athlete, he won two silver medals for the United States.

The first one was at the 1984 Summer Olympics in Los Angeles, California, and the second in 1988 Summer Olympics in Seoul, South Korea. He was first alternate in 1992 Summer Olympics in Barcelona, Spain. He played for the U.S. National Water Polo Team from 1980 to 1992. He graduated from UC Irvine. He was named to the UC Irvine Athletic Hall of Fame in 1997 and USA Water Polo Hall of Fame in 2000.

His younger brother, Jeffrey Campbell, is also a former Olympic water polo player who won a Silver Medal in 1988 Summer Olympics in Seoul, South Korea and placed 4th in 1992 Summer Olympics in Barcelona, Spain.

Peter Campbell died on January 11, 2023, at the age of 62.

See also
 List of Olympic medalists in water polo (men)

References

External links
 

1960 births
2023 deaths
American male water polo players
Olympic silver medalists for the United States in water polo
Water polo players at the 1984 Summer Olympics
Water polo players at the 1988 Summer Olympics
UC Irvine Anteaters men's water polo players
Sportspeople from Salt Lake City
Sportspeople from Irvine, California
Medalists at the 1988 Summer Olympics
Medalists at the 1984 Summer Olympics